Cricket is the most popular sport in Nepal. It is played by many people throughout the country, especially in the Terai region. The biggest cricketing achievement of the national cricket team was when the team reached the qualification tournament of 2014 ICC World T20 held in Bangladesh. Nepal's playing season runs from September to November and starts again in March before finishing in May. The National Cricket Academy, NCA, was formally opened in January 2013 by the Cricket Association of Nepal to guide emerging players and to provide continuous training facilities to the men's national team, women's national team and the under-19 team. As of December 2012, there were 429 senior cricket clubs and 227 junior cricket clubs in Nepal.

History

Beginnings
In 1920s Cricket was introduced to Nepal for the first time by Lt.-Gen.Madan Shumsher JBR youngest son of Rana Prime Minister Maharaja Chandra Shumsher Jang Bahadur Rana. But at the time, cricket was considered a "gentleman's game" so was limited to the ruling Rana family members and some elites of Nepal. Though the game was kept within themselves and other members of the elite, the Cricket Association of Nepal was formed in 1946 to promote cricket amongst the aristocracy.

After the introduction of democracy through the Revolution of 1951, cricket began to spread to the rest of the population. In 1961, in an effort to promote cricket to the whole of Nepal, the Cricket Association of Nepal became part of the National Sports Council. Nevertheless, the National games tended to be limited to Kathmandu until the 1980s.

ICC and ACC Membership
Improvements to the communication and transport infrastructure in Nepal allowed the game to expand outside Kathmandu in the 1980s, and Nepal became an Affiliate Member of the ICC in 1988. A major development programme began in the early 1990s, with regional and district tournaments established and cricket being promoted in the schools. Nepal became an Associate Member of the ACC in 1990 and became a full member in 1994.

Interest in cricket increased quickly in the 1990s, and demand to play was such that the number of teams in tournaments had to be restricted until more facilities could be built. Nepal became an Associate Member of the ICC in 1996, which was the year the national side played for the first time, in the ACC Trophy in Kuala Lumpur. Nepal finished fourth out of six teams in their first round group in this competition, beating Brunei and Japan.

Governing Body

The Cricket Association of Nepal is the official governing body of the sport of cricket in Nepal. It was formed in 1946.

International ground

There are 65 grounds in Nepal with 17 turf wickets, but international matches can be played only at the Tribhuvan University International Cricket Ground. The Pokhara Cricket Ground is the only other ground to host international cricket having hosted the women's tournament at the 2019 South Asian Games.

International cricket

Men's National Team 

The Nepal National Cricket Team represents Nepal in international cricket matches.

Nepal have been participating in international cricket since 1996 when they competed in the 1996 ACC Trophy. They have competed in numerous tournaments over the years including the ICC Trophy (later the ICC World Cup Qualifier), the ICC Intercontinental Cup. The team gained T20 International status for the first time in 2013 after qualifying for the 2014 ICC World Twenty20 which was their first and only appearance at a major ICC event. The team also gained One Day International status in 2018 after finishing 8th in the 2018 Cricket World Cup Qualifier.

One Day International 
The Nepalese team took part in their first one-day international on 1 August 2018 against the Netherlands national team at the VRA Cricket Ground in Amstelveen and registered its first win two days later against them at the same ground. Nepal hosted its first one-day international against the United States national team at the Tribhuvan University Cricket Ground in Kirtipur on 8 February 2020. Nepal is currently competing in the 2019–22 ICC Cricket World Cup League 2 which is their first one-day international tournament.

Twenty20 International 
Nepal faced Hong Kong in their first twenty20 international game on 16 March 2014 at the 2014 ICC World Twenty20 which was their first and only appearance at a major ICC event. Nepal won two of their three matches in the tournament with wins against Hong Kong and Afghanistan and a loss against Bangladesh (their first international match against a full member) as they failed to make it past the first round on net run rate. Nepal holds permanent T20I since 1 January 2019 after a decision by the International Cricket Council to T20I status to all member nations.

Women's National Team

The Nepal national women's cricket team represents Nepal in international women's cricket matches. They made their international debut in the ACC Women's Tournament in Malaysia in July 2007. The women's team has competed in two Women's Asia Cup and regularly competes in Asian Cricket Council events. The women's team hold T20I status since 1 July 2018 after a decision by the International Cricket Council to give T20I status to all member nations.

Domestic Cricket
The seven provinces each have their own team that compete during the domestic cricket season along with three departmental teams. The current domestic teams are:

 Province No. 1
 Province No. 2
 Bagmati Province
 Gandaki Province
 Lumbini Province
 Karnali Province
 Sudurpaschim Province
 Armed Police Force Club
 Nepal Police Club
 Tribhuwan Army Club

The ten teams compete in the Prime Minister One Day Cup and eight teams, the seven provincial teams and Armed Police Force Club, participate in the Prime Minister Cup Women's National Tournament.

Moreover, six franchises each compete in the Dhangadhi Premier League, Everest Premier League and Pokhara Premier League.

See also 

 Cricket Association of Nepal
 Nepal national cricket team
 Nepal national women's cricket team
 Nepal national under-19 cricket team
 National League
 Nepal Premier League
 SPA Cup
 List of cricket grounds in Nepal
 National League Cricket
 Asian Challenger Trophy

References

External links
Nepali Cricket Everything  
Nepal Cricket - Nepal Cricket Scores, Nepal Cricket News, Fixtures & Videos
Asian Cricket Council
Official site of Cricket Association of Nepal
National Cricket Academy in Nepal
Asian Challenger Trophy

 
Sport in Nepal